Otto Groß (12 January 1890 – 16 October 1964) was a German backstroke swimmer who competed in the 1912 Summer Olympics. He was born in Karlsruhe. In 1912 he finished fifth in the 100 metre backstroke competition.

References

External links
profile

1890 births
1964 deaths
German male swimmers
Olympic swimmers of Germany
Swimmers at the 1912 Summer Olympics
Male backstroke swimmers
Sportspeople from Karlsruhe